Erick Junior Ozuna López (born October 5, 1990) is a Dominican Republic footballer who plays as a striker for Universidad O&M and the Dominican Republic national team.

Career statistics

International goals
Scores and results list the Dominican Republic's goal tally first.

References

External links

1990 births
Living people
Dominican Republic footballers
Club Barcelona Atlético players
Tempête FC players
C.D. Árabe Unido players
Dominican Republic international footballers
Dominican Republic expatriate footballers
Expatriate footballers in Haiti
Expatriate footballers in Panama
Liga Panameña de Fútbol players
Liga Dominicana de Fútbol players
Ligue Haïtienne players
Association football forwards